Mauritz is a variant spelling of Maurits. Notable people with the name include:

 Mauritz Andersson (1886–1971), Swedish wrestler
 Gustaf Mauritz Armfelt (1757–1814), Finnish courtier and diplomat
 Mauritz Brännström (1918–2006), Swedish cross-country skier
 Mauritz Carlsson (1890–1953), Swedish track and field athlete
 Mauritz Eriksson (1888–1947), Swedish sport shooter
 Mauritz de Haas (1832–1895), Dutch-American marine painter
 Mauritz Johansson (1881–1966), Swedish sport shooter
 Wilhelm Mauritz Klingspor (1744–1814), Swedish noble military officer
 Kristian Mauritz Mustad (1848–1913), Norwegian politician for the Liberal Party
 Mauritz Rosenberg (1879–1941), Finnish politician
 Mauritz Stiller (1883–1928), Finnish Jewish actor, screenwriter and silent film director
 Mauritz von Wiktorin (1883–1956), Austrian general during World War II

See also
Mauritz Widforss, Stockholm hunting equipment store, merged to become Hennes & Mauritz and later H&M
Maurits (disambiguation)
Moritz (disambiguation)
Moriz

Norwegian masculine given names
Swedish masculine given names
Dutch masculine given names
Surnames from given names

nl:Maurits
no:Maurits
pl:Maurycy
sv:Maurits